The 2014 Diamond Head Classic was a mid-season eight-team college basketball tournament played on December 22, 23, and 25 at the Stan Sheriff Center in Honolulu, Hawaii. It was the sixth annual Diamond Head Classic tournament and was part of the 2014–15 NCAA Division I men's basketball season. George Washington defeated No. 11-ranked Wichita State to with the tournament championship. Kevin Larsen was named the tournament's MVP.

Bracket
Source'''

References

Diamond Head Classic
Diamond Head Classic
2014 in sports in Hawaii